Walker.T is a Jamaican Reggae Artist. He is the self-proclaimed "Reggae Superstar."

Early life and career 
After moving to the United States in 1993 he studied music intently, in hopes of a music career. He joined the United States Marine Corps in 1998 where he further used his music to motivate the troops while in combat in Iraq in 2003. It would take until 2006 for the first official release debut maxi-single "Dance" under the name Walkerton, produced by Tempo Productions in California.

He was signed to Crenshaw Entertainment in 2005 in Los Angeles, California. Walker.T got his big break when he recorded "I Cry", produced by Unseen Lab Records, inc by Qmillion and E-Dee which saw regular radio plays in Jamaica on Irie FM, New York, and Europe. "Nah Study Dem" was released in 2010 and saw entry at No. 36 on the Reggae iTunes charts in Finland in 2010. "Rise di Machine" also made the same Reggae chart at No. 37

Education 
University at Buffalo then transferring to Columbia College where he earned a bachelor's degree in Business Administration. He then attended Webster University where he earns a master's degree in Business Administration (MBA).

Discography 
Albums
2005:The Beginning – J.P Productions
2006:Dance – Tempo Productions   
2009: The Unknown Riddim – San Music Productions (SMP)

Singles
2009, Re-released 2012:I Cry – Unseen Lab Recordings  
2011: No Killing – San Music Productions (SMP)
2012: Jah by My Side – San Music Productions (SMP)
2013: Strength & Power – San Music Productions (SMP)
2015: Rise – San Music Production (SMP)
2015: Level Dem (feat. E-Dee) San Music Productions (SMP)

Guest Appearances
2005: Strykers Club Album contributing vocals on (The boy you knew, nothing at all)

References

External links
 

Jamaican reggae musicians
1978 births
Living people